Silvia Strukel (12 April 1916 – 1997) was an Italian fencer. She competed in the women's individual foil event at the 1952 Summer Olympics.

References

1916 births
1997 deaths
Italian female fencers
Olympic fencers of Italy
Fencers at the 1952 Summer Olympics